Joseph Isaac Spadafora Whitaker (19 March 1850 in Palermo – 3 November 1936 in Rome) was a Sicilian-English ornithologist, archaeologist and sportsman. He was a member of the Whitaker family. He is mainly known for his work on the birds of Tunisia, and for being involved in the foundation of the Sicilian football club US Città di Palermo. He was married to the author and hostess Tina Scalia Whitaker.

Biography 
Whitaker's family came from Huddersfield in west Yorkshire. He inherited the Ingham Marsala wine business through his paternal grandmother, Mary Ingham, whose brother Benjamin (1784-1861) went into business in Palermo. The Inghams were from Ossett in Yorkshire - there is an Ossett website which gives a detailed biography of the Ingham Marsala Wine co. He and his brother William Ingham Whitaker (Pylewell Park) inherited vast vineyards and his great grandfather Ingham's banking empire. Their story is told in Raleigh Trevelyan's 1972 Princes Under the Volcano: Two Hundred Years of a British Dynasty in Sicily.

Marriage and children
Joseph Whitaker married Tina Scalia. She was the daughter of General Alfonso Scalia, who landed in Sicily with Giuseppe Garibaldi during the years leading up to the Risorgimento. Choosing to settle in Palermo over the more provincial Marsala, the couple built as their family home the Villa Malfitano, an Art Nouveau mansion near Zisa Castle on the Via Dante. In these years, the Belle Époque age, the house was the venue for lavish parties attended by British and Italian royalty and celebrated European society. Tina Whitaker knew Richard Wagner, Benito Mussolini, the Kaiser and Edward VII, Empress Eugenie and Queen Mary. She unwittingly found herself in a circle involved in the Irish Crown Jewels scandal. In 1907 she published Sicily & England: Political and Social Reminiscences 1848-1870.

The couple had two daughters; the elder of whom married General Antonio Di Giorgio(1868-1932), a Minister of War who fought in the 1st and 2nd wars in Abyssinia. Thus the family was firmly established in the upper echelons of Italian Society.

Adult life
Whitaker himself was founder and president of the Society for the Prevention of Cruelty to Animals at Palermo, and also he was a major figure in the foundation of US Città di Palermo in the later 1880s, becoming the first president of the football club.

Birds
In 1891 already a very keen ornithologist Whitaker joined the British Ornithologists' Union. Collecting expeditions to Tunisia followed. These extended over a period of ten years (1894–1904). Notebooks kept at the time contain information on the natural history of the birds as well as other fauna and also the flora of Tunisia.

The Tunisian bird and bird nest and egg collection was housed in a villa in the grounds of his home "Malfitano" alongside a very complete collection of Sicilian birds and collections made on his behalf by Edward Dobson in Morocco. To these were added specimens of birds from the Mediterranean littoral.

Some of Whitaker's collection of Tunisian birds are in the Natural History Museum, London. The Sicilian birds are divided between the Royal Scottish Museum (bird skins) and the Ulster Museum (bird mounts, eggs and nests).

Gallery of Birds in the Whitaker Collection

Archaeology
Whitaker devoted the last years of his life to archaeology, purchasing the island of Motya near Trapani the site of a  Phoenician town founded in the eighth century BC. He wrote a book on his excavations in 1921. The site may be explored (online) using the Motya link and is open to visitors.

Works
Sulla migrazione degli uccelli, specialmente in Sicilia. Naturalista sicil.121–127. 1882
Notes on some Tunisian birds. Ibis 78–100, map. 1894.
Additional notes on Tunisian birds. Ibis 85 -106, map. 1895.
Further notes on Tunisian birds. Ibis 87 -99, map. 1896.
On Turnix sylvatica in Sicily Ibis 290–291. 1896.
Exhibition of skins of Sturnix unicolor from Morocco . Bull. Brit.Orn.Club vol.vii.pxvii (p 155 of Ibis 1898). 1897
Description of Two new species, Garrulus ornops, sp. nov., and Rhodopechys aliena, sp. nov. Bull. Brit.Orn.Club vol.vii.pxvii 1897.
Further notes on Tunisian birds Ibis 125–132. 1898.
On the Grey Shrikes of Tunisia Ibis 288–231.1898.
On a collection of birds from Morocco with descriptions of Lanius algieriensis dodsoni, subsp. nov. (p. 599) and of Octocorys atlas (p.xiii) Ibis 592–610.1898.
Description of a new Chat, Saxicola caterinae, sp. nov., from Algeria and Morocco, and a new crossbill, Loxia curvirostra poliogyna, subsp. nov., from Tunisia Ibis 624–625. 1898.
Description of a new species of Shore-Lark, Otocorys atlas, from the Atlas Mountains of Morocco. Bull. Brit. Orn. Club. Vol.vii, p.xlvii (p 432 of Ibis) 1898.
Sulla riproduzione in cattività del Pollo sultano (Porphyrio coeruleus Vandelli) volg. sic. gaddo fagiano o gaddu fascianu. Naturalista sic. vol.3, 17–20. 1899
On an Abnormal nest of Ardea cinerea Bull. Brit. Orn. Club. vol. viii, p.xxxvii. 1899.
On the breeding of the Purple Gallinule in captivity. Ibis vol. vii. p. 502–505. 1899
On a new Chat from Southern Persia. Bull. Br. Orn. Club vol.x. p.17. 1899
The passage of Cuculus canorus L. in Sicily. Aquila vo. vi. p.99-100. 1899
On the Occurrence of  Caprimulgus aeggptius at Palermo Ibis p. 475-476. 1899
On a new species of Acredula from Sicily. Bull. Br. Orn. Club vol.x. 11. p.51-52. 1901
On some species of Crested Lark. Ibis vol.xii. p.38. 1901
On rare species from Tripoli. Ibis vol.xiii. p. 15-17. 1902
Further information on two recently described species of Passerine Birds. Ibis. vol.x. p.54-59. 1902
On a small collection of Birds from Tripoli. Ibis. vo.x. p.643-656. 1902
On the occurrence of Porphyrio alleni in Italy and Tunis. Ibisvol.xi. p.431-432. 1903
Cisticola cisticola mauritanica subsp. nova. Bull. Br. Orn. Club vol.xiv. p.19-20. 1903
La Glareola melanoptera in Sicilia. Avicula vo.viii. p. 84-85. 1904
Il Corvus corone, la Linota rufescens e la Glareola melanoptera in Sicilia. Avicula vo.viii. p.56. 1904
Corvus corone, Linota rufescens and Glareola melanoptera in Sicily. Ibis vo.xii. p.477-478. 1904
Alauda arvensis harterti subsp. nova. Bull. Br. Orn. Club vol.xv. p.19-20. 1904
1905 The Birds of Tunisia, 2 Vols. Pp. xxxii, 294; xviii, 410, 17 full page plates of which 15 are handcoloured after Grönvold, 2 photograv., 1 clr folding map. London, 1st edition. Edition limited to 250 copies only.London, R.H. Porter,1905.Digitised text Volume 1 Digitised text Volume 2
Biographical notice on the late Professor Giglioli. Ibis vol.xviii. p.537-538. 1910
Letter on Pterocles senegallus in Sicily. Ibis vo.xviii. p. 102. 1910
Sulla necessità di legislazione internazionale per proibire l'importazione in Europa delle pelli e piume di alcune specie di uccelli. Riv. Ital. Orn. vo. iii p. 126–135. 1915
The Birds of Sicily. Manuscript in the Villa Whitaker Malfitano. Palermo. 1920 aboutMotya – A Phoenician Colony in Sicily, London. G. Bell & Sons, 1921.

References

Lo Valvo, F. and Massa B. Catalogo Della Collezione Ornitologica Joseph Whitaker (1850–1936) Estrato da: Il Naturalista Siciliano''.S.IV.XXIV (Suppl.), 2000 13 figures.

External links 

 
 

1850 births
1936 deaths
British archaeologists
British ornithologists
English people of Italian descent
Archaeologists from Palermo
Italian football chairmen and investors
Italian ornithologists
Italian people of English descent
Scientists from Palermo
Palermo F.C. chairmen and investors
Businesspeople from Palermo
Phoenician-punic archaeologists